The 2008 A-League Pre-Season Challenge Cup competition was held in July and August 2008, in the lead up to the start of the Australian A-League football 2008–09 season.  

All eight A-League clubs competed and were drawn into two groups of four teams.  The format of the cup was modified from previous editions, reducing the number of matches.  A group stage with three regular rounds saw team play each other in their group once, with the winner of each group advancing to the final.  The final was played on 6 August, the first mid-week final in the competition history.  The shortened format allowed clubs to schedule other matches in the lead up to the start of the A-League, and was completed before the 2008 Summer Olympics in which Australia competed.

Continuing from previous years, most Pre-Season Cup matches were played at venues in regional centres to expand the profile of the clubs and the league.  Bunbury, Caloundra, Cessnock, Mandurah and Mount Gambier all hosted matches for the first time, while Launceston, Campbelltown, Port Macquarie and Wollongong hosted matches again.

Group stage

Group A

Group B

Final

Top goalscorers
2 Goals:
  Cristiano (Adelaide United)
  Sergio van Dijk (Queensland Roar)

1 Goal:
  Adrian Trinidad (Perth Glory)
  Ahmad Elrich (Central Coast Mariners)
  Dylan MacAllister (Central Coast Mariners)
  Nik Mrdja (Central Coast Mariners)
  Sasho Petrovski (Central Coast Mariners)
  Brad Porter (Central Coast Mariners)
  Tom Pondeljak (Melbourne Victory)
  Michael Thwaite (Melbourne Victory)
  Noel Spencer (Newcastle Jets)
  Michael Zullo (Queensland Roar)
  Alex Brosque (Sydney FC)
  Iain Fyfe (Sydney FC)
  Chris Payne (Sydney FC)
  Mitchell Prentice (Sydney FC)
  Troy Hearfield (Wellington Phoenix FC)
  Adam Kwasnik (Wellington Phoenix FC)
  Ney Fabiano (Melbourne Victory)
  Daniel (Wellington Phoenix FC)
  Gao Leilei (Wellington Phoenix FC)
  Shane Smeltz (Wellington Phoenix FC)

References

A-league Pre-season Challenge Cup, 2008
A-League Pre-Season Challenge Cup